The Ministry of Electronics and Information Technology (MEITy) is an executive agency of the Union Government of the Republic of India. It was carved out of the Ministry of Communications and Information Technology on 19 July 2016 as a standalone ministerial agency responsible for IT policy, strategy and development of the electronics industry.
Under the sponsorship of the Ministry of Electronics and Information Technology, the "Northeast Heritage" Web, owned by the Government of India, publishes information on Northeast India, in 5 Indian languages, Assamese, Meitei (Manipuri), Bodo, Khasi and Mizo, in addition to Hindi and English.

History
Previously known as "The Department of Information Technology", it was renamed to The Department of Electronics and Information Technology in 2012. On 19 July 2016, DeitY was made into full-fledged ministry, which henceforth is known as the Ministry of Electronics and Information Technology, bifurcating it from the Ministry of Communications and Information Technology.

Organisation structure
The following is a list of child agencies subordinated within "The Ministry of Electronics and Information Technology, Union Government of the Republic of India".

To boost and leverage Quantum computing potential, ministry has done a partnership with Amazon Web Services (AWS). The initiative is said to boost researchers and scientists work on quantum computing and will provide access to Amazon’s Braket cloud-based quantum computing service. Ministry based on the proposal received and vetted by a steering committee will approve and sanction the set-up of the lab to bolster the quantum computing capability in India.

Child agencies 

National Informatics Centre (NIC)
 Standardisation Testing and Quality Certification Directorate (STQC)
 Controller of Certifying Authorities (CCA)
 Cyber Appellate Tribunal (CAT)
 Semiconductor Integrated Circuits Layout-Design Registry
Indian Computer Emergency Response Team (CERT-In)
IN Registry

Companies under MeitY
CSC e-Governance Services India Limited
Digital Locker
Media Lab Asia (MLAsia)
National Informatics Centre Services Incorporated (NICSI) — Public Sector Enterprise under control of National Informatics Centre.
National Internet Exchange of India (NIXI)
STPI
Unique Identification Authority of India (UIDAI)

Autonomous Societies of MeitY
Education and Research in Computer Networking (ERNET)
Centre for Development of Advanced Computing (C-DAC)
 Centre for Materials for Electronics Technology (C-MET)
National Institute of Electronics and Information Technology (NIELIT) — Formerly DOEACC Society
 Society for Applied Microwave Electronics Engineering and Research (SAMEER)
Software Technology Parks of India (STPI)
 Electronics and Computer Software Export Promotion Council (ESC)
 Semi-Conductor Laboratory (SCL)

Ministers

Ministers as the Minister of Communications and Information Technology (India) (1947 - 2016)
For a list of ministers, see Ministry of Communications and Information Technology (India)#List of Ministers.

Ministers as the Minister of Electronics and Information Technology (2016 - onwards)

List of Ministers of State

References

Government ministries of India
Ministry of Communications and Information Technology (India)
Information technology organisations based in India
Electronics industry in India
2016 establishments in India